Ponte nelle Alpi (English: Bridge into the Alps, Venetian: Pont) is a comune (municipality) in the Province of Belluno in the Italian region Veneto, located about  north of Venice and about  northeast of Belluno.

Ponte nelle Alpi borders the following municipalities: Belluno, Alpago, Longarone, Soverzene.

References

Cities and towns in Veneto